AD-5 or variation, may refer to:

 AD 5, the 5th year of the Common Era
 , an auxiliary cruiser of the U.S. Navy
 Douglas AD-5 Skyraider, fighter-bomber airplane
 AD5 experiment "ALPHA" at the CERN Antiproton Decelerator ring; an antimatter physics experiment
 Ad5, adenovirus serotype 5, a virus commonly used as a recombinant virus therapy vector (rAd5)
 Alzheimer's disease, stage 5
 Alzheimer's Disease 5, a familial variant of Alzhemier's; see List of OMIM disorder codes

See also

 5AD (radio station), Adelaide, South Australia, Australia
 Ad5-nCoV, COVID-19 vaccine
 Ad5-EBOV, Ebola vaccine
 5 (disambiguation)
 AD (disambiguation)